The following tables compare general and technical information for a number of wiki software packages.

General information
Systems listed on a light purple background are no longer in active development.

Target audience

Features 1

Features 2

Installation

See also
 Comparison of
wiki farms
notetaking software
text editors
HTML editors
word processors
wiki hosting services
List of
wikis
wiki software
personal information managers
text editors
outliners for
desktops
mobile devices
web-based

Footnotes

 Comparison
Wiki software
Text editor comparisons